Sampangi is a 2001 Indian Telugu-language romantic drama film directed by Sana Yadireddy and starring newcomers Deepak and Kanchi Kaul.

Plot 
A Hindu boy and a Muslim girl fall in love.

Cast 
Deepak as Abhishek 
Kanchi Kaul as Salwar Rizwana 
Ranganath as Sankarnarayan
Chalapathi Rao as Osman

Production 
The film is directed by Sana Yadireddy, who previously directed Pittala Dora (1996), Jai Bhajaranga Bhali (1997) and Bachelors (2000). Debutante Deepak, who came to Hyderabad to shoot for an advertisement, received the role after an audition.

Soundtrack 
The music was composed by Ghantadi Krishna.

Release and reception 
The film had houseful shows in Hyderabad and Secunderabad. However, the screening of the film in Nalgonda district was stopped following protests by Muslims. The film was a box office success, and Deepak earned the name Sampangi Deepak. The film was remade in Hindi by Krishna as Ishq Hai Tumse (2004).

A critic from Full Hyderabad wrote that "A good family movie, despite a rather clichéd overall theme".

Awards
Nandi Awards
Best Male Dubbing Artist - Raghu (for Deepak)

References

External links 

Telugu films remade in other languages